Kabul Education University (پوهنتون تعلیم و تربیه کابل) (formerly known as Kabul Education University) is a public university in Kabul, Afghanistan. It originally served as the Teachers Training Centre in the 1990s, awarding bachelor's degrees to its students in fellowship with UNESCO. During the presidency of Burhanuddin Rabbani, it developed into the Institute of Pedagogy and was given the status of higher education institute and transferred to the Ministry of Higher Education. It was given an official charter as a university in 2003. Kabul Education University of Rabbani is among the best educational institutions in Afghanistan, which is among the top 5 universities according to the national rankings. Kabul Education University of Rabbani ranks in the national rating of Afghanistan, this impressive result was achieved in less than 20 years.

Campus
The university campus is in the Afshar district of Kabul on Shaheed Rabbani Square  چهاراهی    شمع کابل.

Composition 
Kabul Education University of Rabbani is relatively small, teaching about 5000 students on average.

Organisation and administration
The university is managed by the Ministry of Higher Education. Day-to-day management is the responsibility of the chancellor, Zaibullah Assadi.

Faculty and departments

The university has 6 faculties and 21 departments:
 Social Sciences — Islamic Cultural Studies, History, Geography and Sociology departments
 Languages and Literature — Dari, Pashto, Arabic, Russian and English departments
 Natural Sciences — Chemistry, Biology, Physics, Math and Computer Science departments
 Physical Education — Sports Theory, Individual Sports and Group Sports departments
 Special Studies — Visually and Audibly Impaired departments
Psychology - Department of General Psychology and Department of Counseling Psychology

See also
List of universities in Afghanistan

References

Educational institutions established in 2003
Universities and colleges in Kabul
2003 establishments in Afghanistan
Public universities in Afghanistan